Kevin Parsons, Jr. MHA, (born 1961) is a Canadian politician from Newfoundland and Labrador, Canada. He currently serves as the Caucus Chair for the Progressive Conservative Party. Parsons has represented the electoral district of Cape St. Francis in the Newfoundland and Labrador House of Assembly since 2008. He has previously served as the Parliamentary Secretary to the Minister of Business, Tourism, Culture and Rural Development. Prior to entering provincial politics Parsons was the Mayor of Flatrock.

Provincial politics
A member of the Progressive Conservative Party, Parsons was elected in a by-election on August 27, 2008, following the death of longtime Newfoundland and Labrador House of Assembly and former cabinet minister Jack Byrne. His father Kevin Sr. represented the district from 1986 and 1993. Parsons was re-elected in the 2011 and 2015 provincial elections. He was re-elected again in the 2019 provincial election. In October 2020, Parsons announced he would not seek re-election in the 2021 provincial election.

Electoral record

References

External links
 Kevin Parsons' PC Party biography

1961 births
Progressive Conservative Party of Newfoundland and Labrador MHAs
Living people
Mayors of places in Newfoundland and Labrador
21st-century Canadian politicians
Newfoundland and Labrador municipal councillors